Apsalos (before 1926: Δραγουμάνιτσα - Dragoumanitsa) is a village in Pella regional unit, Macedonia, Greece.

Apsalos had 1277 inhabitants in 1981. In fieldwork done by Riki Van Boeschoten in late 1993, Apsalos was populated by a Greek population descended from Anatolian Greek refugees who arrived during the Greek-Turkish population exchange, and Aromanians. Pontic Greek was spoken in the village by people over 30 in public and private settings. Children understood the language, but mostly did not use it. The Aromanian language was spoken in the village by people over 30 in public and private settings. Children understood the language, but mostly did not use it.

References

Populated places in Pella (regional unit)
Aromanian settlements in Greece